The 2004 Big Sky Conference men's basketball tournament was held March 6–10 at Reese Court at the University of Eastern Washington in Cheney, Washington.

Top-seeded  defeated  in the championship game, 71–59, to win their first Big Sky men's basketball tournament title. EWU had the lost the three previous conference championship games. 

The Eagles, in turn, received an automatic bid to the 2004 NCAA tournament, their first appearance in the Division I tournament. No other Big Sky members were invited this year.

Format
No new teams were added to the Big Sky prior to the 2003–04 season, leaving total membership at eight.

No changes were made to the existing tournament format. Only the top six teams from the regular season conference standings were invited to the tournament. The two top teams were given byes into the semifinals while the third- through sixth-seeded teams were placed and paired into the preliminary quarterfinal round. Following the quarterfinals, the two victorious teams were re-seeded in the semifinal round, with the lowest-seeded remaining team paired with the tournament's highest seed and vis-versa for the other.

Bracket

See also
Big Sky Conference women's basketball tournament

References

Big Sky Conference men's basketball tournament
Tournament
Big Sky Conference men's basketball tournament
Big Sky Conference men's basketball tournament
Basketball competitions in Washington (state)
Cheney, Washington
College sports tournaments in Washington (state)